The Waikato Institute of Technology, also known as Wintec, is an institute of technology based in New Zealand's Waikato region. Wintec offers over 130 degrees, diplomas and certificates. Wintec specialises in applied tertiary training for nurses, social workers, midwives, graphic designers, performing artists, engineers, trades people, early childhood teachers, horticulturists, arborists and sport scientists. Programmes range from Level 1 to Level 9. 

Wintec has 13,000 full and part-time students. Over 25% of Wintec students identify as Māori.

History
The institution was founded in 1924 as Hamilton Technical College. The name was changed to  Waikato Technical Institute in 1968 and to The Waikato Polytechnic in 1987. The name changed again in 2001, to The Waikato Institute of Technology. On 1 April 2020, Waikato Institute of Technology was subsumed into New Zealand Institute of Skills & Technology alongside the 15 other Institutes of Technology and Polytechnics (ITPs).

Locations
Wintec has three main campuses in Hamilton as well as facilities at Thames and the Otorohanga Trade Training Centre.
 City campus — Anglesea Street 
 Rotokauri (formerly Avalon) campus — Akoranga Road 
 Horticulture Education Centre at Hamilton Gardens — Cobham Drive 

The institute uses three additional campuses in the Waikato region.

Wintec offers student accommodation at the City and Rotokauri campuses.

Structure and governance
Wintec's executive team is made up of 11 executives, including the Chief Executive. The chief executive reports to Wintec's governing body, the Wintec Council.

Faculties
 Centre for Beauty Therapy, Hairdressing & Hospitality
 Centre for Business & Enterprise
 Centre for Information Technology
 Centre for Engineering & Industrial Design
 Centre for Health & Social Practice
 Centre for Languages
 School of Media Arts
 Centre for Applied Science & Primary Industries
 Centre for Sport Science & Human Performance
 Centre for Trades
 Centre for Research & Applied Innovation
 Centre for Education & Foundation Pathways
 Design Factory NZ

References

Educational institutions established in 1968
Education in Hamilton, New Zealand
Buildings and structures in Hamilton, New Zealand
Vocational education in New Zealand
Technical universities and colleges in New Zealand
2020 disestablishments in New Zealand